Gibson is a small town in southeastern Western Australia, about  north of Esperance. At the 2016 census, Gibson had a population of 449.

History
The population of the area was 16 (7 males and 9 females) in 1898.

Gibson was originally proposed in about 1910 as a siding on the Esperance Branch Railway due to a reliable water source in the area, named by surveyor A. W. Canning after a man who discovered the soak whilst searching for stock. The railway itself was not completed until 1925, but the townsite was gazetted on 19 October 1921.

Transport 
It is served by a station on the Brookfield Rail network, and is also the site of the Esperance Airport.

Esperance Bird & Animal Park
Esperance Bird & Animal Park is a small animal park located at Gibson and includes: cockatoos, parrots, macaws, eagles, emus, sheep, goats, highland cattle, horses, llamas, kangaroos, wallabies and foxes.

References 

Towns in Western Australia
Shire of Esperance